Busy Internet is a Ghanaian Internet service provider (ISP) providing a number of services including ADSL broadband, data hosting and Internet café in Ghana.

History 
BusyInternet was founded in 2001. It is located at Ring Road East in Accra.

Services 
 ADSL broadband
 Data hosting
 Internet café

References

External links

Companies based in Accra
Internet service providers of Africa
Science and technology in Ghana
Ghanaian companies established in 2001